The 1843 New South Wales colonial election was held between  15 June and 3 July 1843. This election was for 24 seats in the New South Wales Legislative Council and it was conducted in 15 single-member constituencies, two 2-member constituencies and one 5-member constituency, all with a first past the post system. This included 6 members in what became the Colony of Victoria and a single member for the coast north of Newcastle. The Legislative Council was a hybrid system with 36 members, 24 elected, 6 appointed by virtue of their office (Colonial Secretary, Colonial Treasurer, Auditor-General, Attorney General, Commander of the forces and Collector of Customs) and 6 nominated. The appointments and elections were for five year terms.

The right to vote was limited to men aged over 21 who owned property worth at least £200 or occupied a house at £20 per year. There was a higher requirement to be a member of the Council, owning property worth £2,000 or income from real estate of £100 per year. If a man fulfilled these requirements in multiple constituencies, then he was allowed to cast a vote in each. This was known as plural voting.

This was the first election held and the first form of representative government in Australia. The Governor retained considerable power, including the power to disallow bills and in appointing 12 of the 36 seats. As government appointments were expected to support the government, it only required the support of 6 of the 24 elected members to pass any bill.

The election was marked by a riot at Sydney involving 4-500 men, which resulted in a fatality, and a smaller riot at Windsor.

Key dates

Results

|}

See also
 Members of the New South Wales Legislative Council, 1843–1851
 Results of the 1843 New South Wales colonial election

References

Elections in New South Wales
New South Wales Colonial Election, 1843
New South Wales Colonial Election, 1843
New South Wales Colonial Election, 1843
1840s in New South Wales